Robert Guy Scanlan Jr. (born August 9, 1966), is a former professional baseball player who pitched in the Major Leagues from 1991-2001. He played for the Chicago Cubs (1991-1993), Milwaukee Brewers (1994-1995, 2000), Detroit Tigers (1996), Kansas City Royals (1996), Houston Astros (1998) and Montreal Expos (2001).

In 290 games, Scanlan put together a 20-34 record with 17 saves, 245 strikeouts and a 4.63 ERA.

In the January 2008 issue of San Diego Magazine he was selected as one of the "50 People to Watch in 2008".

As of 2012, Scanlan serves as a color analyst for San Diego Padres radio broadcasts, and previously had worked as a pregame and postgame host for Padres telecasts on 4SD. Scanlan also sometimes serves as the field reporter for Padres TV broadcasts.

On June 13, 2022, Scanlan joined Tony Gwynn Jr as the 97.3 radio play by play commentator in order to replace Jesse Agler for the night.

References

External links

1966 births
Living people
American expatriate baseball players in Canada
American expatriate baseball players in Mexico
Baseball players from Los Angeles
Chicago Cubs players
Clearwater Phillies players
Colorado Springs Sky Sox players
Columbus Clippers players
Detroit Tigers players
Diablos Rojos del México players
Florida Complex League Phillies players
Houston Astros players
Indianapolis Indians players
Iowa Cubs players
Kansas City Royals players
Lakeland Tigers players
Las Vegas Stars (baseball) players
Maine Phillies players
Major League Baseball pitchers
Mexican League baseball pitchers
Milwaukee Brewers players
Montreal Expos players
New Orleans Zephyrs players
Omaha Royals players
Ottawa Lynx players
Reading Phillies players
Round Rock Express players
San Diego Padres announcers
Scranton/Wilkes-Barre Red Barons players
Spartanburg Suns players
Toledo Mud Hens players